Narimanovsky (masculine), Narimanovskaya (feminine), or Narimanovskoye (neuter) may refer to:
Narimanovsky District, a district of Astrakhan Oblast, Russia
Narimanovsky (rural locality), a settlement in Oryol Oblast, Russia